The 1987 election of members to the Senate of the Philippines was the 23rd election to the Senate of the Philippines. It was held on Monday, May 11, 1987. The Philippine Senate was re-instituted following the approval of a new constitution in 1987 restoring the bicameral Congress of the Philippines; earlier, a constitution was approved in 1973 that created a unicameral Batasang Pambansa (parliament) that replaced the bicameral Congress. The last Senate election prior to this was the 1971 election.

The Lakas ng Bayan Coalition (LABAN) got 64.9% of the vote but won 22 out of 24 seats in the Senate; only two candidates from the opposition Grand Alliance for Democracy won: former Secretary of National Defense Juan Ponce Enrile and San Juan Mayor Joseph Estrada, despite getting 26.6% of the vote.

Along with the 1916 and 1941 elections, this is the third and last senatorial election where all seats were up.

Background
After Marcos was ousted in the People Power Revolution in 1986, his political party, the Kilusang Bagong Lipunan, was fragmented. Almost all its members including Assemblymen Arturo Tolentino, Jose Rono, Nicanor Yniquez, Cesar Virata who were coming from the Nacionalista Party among others were orphaned.

On the other hand, the Aquino coalition took all positions in the Ministry/Cabinet. Most notable were Prime Minister Salvador Laurel, Local Government Minister Aquilino Pimentel Jr. and Executive Secretary Joker Arroyo.

The Lakas ng Bayan (LABAN) consists of the PDP–Laban headed by Local Government Minister Pimentel, the Lakas ng Bansa party headed by Assemblyman Ramon Mitra, the UNIDO, the Liberal Party headed by Senator Jovito Salonga, the National Union of Christian Democrats headed by Raul Manglapus, the Bayang Nagkakaisa sa Diwa at Layunin headed by Butz Aquino, Panaghusia and other pro-Cory regional parties

The GAD consists of the faction of the KBL headed by Assemblyman Arturo Tolentino, the Jose Roy faction of the Nacionalista Party headed by Renato Cayetano, the pre-1986 opposition leaders who defected from Aquino headed by Senator Eva Estrada-Kalaw, the Partido Nacionalista ng Pilipinas headed by Former Labor Minister Blas Ople, the Mindanao Alliance, the Muslim Federal Party and the Christian Social Democratic Party.

The UPP-KBL coalition was composed of pro-Marcos forces. This coalition included some GAD candidates as guest candidates, and was considered to be the loyalist politicians of the Marcos government.

The Left also put up a seven-man slate, under the Partido ng Bayan banner. These includes the Bagong Alyansang Makabayan and its allied organizations.

Other political parties who fielded candidates are the Lapiang Manggagawa, Lakas ng Bansa and the Partido Nacionalista ng Pilipinas, along with several independent candidates.

Major Senate candidates

Administration coalition

Main opposition coalition

 defected from President Aquino

Other notable candidates

*Guest candidate

Results
The Lakas ng Bayan (LABAN) coalition won 22 seats, while the Grand Alliance for Democracy (GAD) won two.

Winners who had served in the 1935 constitution Senate were LABAN's Raul Manglapus, Ernesto Maceda, John Henry Osmeña, Jovito Salonga and Mamintal A.J. Tamano.

Winners who had served in the Batasang Pambansa were LABAN's Neptali Gonzales, Orlando S. Mercado, Aquilino Pimentel Jr., Alberto Romulo, and Victor ZIga, and GAD's Juan Ponce Enrile.

Winners who had neither served in the 1935 constitution Senate and in the 1973 constitution Batasang Pambansa were LABAN's Heherson Alvarez, Edgardo Angara, Butz Aquino, Teofisto Guingona Jr., Ernesto Herrera, Sotero Laurel, Joey Lina, Leticia Ramos-Shahani, Nina Rasul, Rene Saguisag and Wigberto Tañada, and GAD's Joseph Estrada.

The first 21 proclaimed winners were all seated on June 30, the day the terms start. The 22nd and 23rd senators were proclaimed a few days after June 30. Finally, the Commission on Elections, due to the tight race between GAD's Juan Ponce Enrile and LABAN's Augusto Sanchez, only declared the 24th winner by August.

Key:
 ‡ Seats up
 + Gained by a party from another party
 ^ Vacancy

Tally of votes

Per coalition

See also
Commission on Elections
8th Congress of the Philippines

References

External links
 Official website of the Commission on Elections
 Official website of the House of Representatives
 G.R. No. 83767 October 27, 1988

1987
1987 elections in the Philippines